Charlie Stewart (born 1928) is an Australian association football player who played as a winger during the 1940s and 1950s.

Club career
Stewart played club football for Woonona-Bulli in the New South Wales State League.

International career
Stewart played five times between 1947 and 1955 for Australia, scoring three goals.

Honours
In 2006 Stewart was inducted into the Football Federation Australia Football Hall of Fame.

References

Living people
1928 births
Australian soccer players
Association football wingers
Australia international soccer players